Frank Parish Conroy (14 October 1890 – 24 February 1964) was a British film and stage actor who appeared in many films, notably Grand Hotel (1932), The Little Minister (1934) and The Ox-Bow Incident (1943).

Career 
Born in Derby, England, Conroy began acting on stage in 1908. He acted in Shakespearean plays in England from 1910 until he came to the United States in 1915. He was responsible for building the Greenwich Village Theatre which opened in 1917, and he directed productions of the repertory theater there for three years.

He appeared in more than 40 Broadway plays, beginning with The Passing Show of 1913 (1913) and ending with Calculated Risk (1962). He won a Tony Award for best supporting actor for his performance in Graham Greene's The Potting Shed (1957).

Conroy's work on television included appearances on Kraft Theater and The Play of the Week.

Personal life and death
Conroy had a wife, Ruth, and a son, Richard. He died of heart disease in Paramus, New Jersey, at age 73.

Select Broadway credits

 The Passing Show of 1913 (1913)
 The Bad Man (1920) as Gilbert Jones
 Daddy's Gone A-Huntin''' (1921) as Julien Fields
 The Constant Wife (1926) as Bernard Kersal
 Wings Over Europe (1928) as Arthur
 On Borrowed Time (1938) as Mr. Brink
 The Little Foxes (1939) as Horace
 The Potting Shed (1957) as Father William Callifer
 Calculated Risk (1962) as Clyde Norman

Partial filmography

 The Royal Family of Broadway (1930) – Gilmore Marshall
 Hell Divers (1931) – Chaplain
 Bad Company (1931) – Markham King
 Possessed (1931) – Horace Travers
 West of Broadway (1931) – Judge Barham
 Manhattan Parade (1931) – Bill Brighton
 Disorderly Conduct (1932) – Tony Alsotto
 Grand Hotel (1932) – Rohna
 Ann Carver's Profession (1933) – Baker (uncredited)
 Midnight Mary (1933) – District Attorney
 The Man Who Dared (1933) – Con Artist (uncredited)
 Storm at Daybreak (1933) – Archduke Franz Ferdinand (uncredited)
 Night Flight (1933) – Radio Operator
 Ace of Aces (1933) – Maj. / Lt. Col. Wentworth
 The Kennel Murder Case (1933) – Brisbane Coe
 Frontier Marshal (1934) – George 'Oscar' Reid
 The Cat and the Fiddle (1934) – Theatre Owner
 Keep 'Em Rolling (1934) – Captain R.G. Deane
 The Crime Doctor (1934) – Martin Crowder
 Upper World (1934) – Paul—Stream's Attorney (uncredited)
 Manhattan Melodrama (1934) as Blackie's Lawyer
 Sadie McKee (1934) – Dr. Briggs (uncredited)
 Little Miss Marker (1934) – Doctor Ingalls (uncredited)
 Such Women Are Dangerous (1934) – Bronson
 Return of the Terror (1934) – Prosecuting Attorney
 The Captain Hates the Sea (1934) – State's Attorney (uncredited)
 Wednesday's Child (1934) – The Judge
 Evelyn Prentice (1934) – Dist. Atty. Farley
 I'll Fix It (1934) – District Attorney (uncredited)
 The White Parade (1934) – Dr. Thorne
 365 Nights in Hollywood (1934) – Studio Executive (uncredited)
 The Little Minister (1934) – Lord Rintoul
 West Point of the Air (1935) – Captain Cannon
 Charlie Chan in Egypt (1935) – Prof. John Thurston
 Dante's Inferno (1935) – Defense Attorney (uncredited)
 The Call of the Wild (1935) – John Blake
 I Live My Life (1935) – Doctor
 She Couldn't Take It (1935) – Attorney Henry Raleigh (uncredited)
 The Last Days of Pompeii (1935) – Gaius Tanno
 Show Them No Mercy! (1935) – Reed
 Nobody's Fool (1936) – Jake Cavendish
 The White Angel (1936) – Mr. Le Froy
 Meet Nero Wolfe (1936) – Dr. Nathaniel Bradford
 The Gorgeous Hussy (1936) – John C. Calhoun
 Charlie Chan at the Opera (1936) – Mr. Whitely
 Stolen Holiday (1937) – Dupont
 Love Is News (1937) – A.G. Findlay
 Nancy Steele Is Missing! (1937) – Dan Mallon
 That I May Live (1937) – Pop
 This Is My Affair (1937) – President William McKinley
 The Jones Family in Big Business (1937) – Leland Whitney
 The Emperor's Candlesticks (1937) – Col. Radoff
 Music for Madame (1937) – Morton Harding
 The Last Gangster (1937) – Sid Gorman
 Wells Fargo (1937) – Ward – Banker
 This Woman is Mine (1941) – First Mate Fox
 The Adventures of Martin Eden (1942) – Carl Brissenden
 Crossroads (1942) – Defense Attorney (uncredited)
 The Loves of Edgar Allan Poe (1942) – John Allan
 Crash Dive (1943) – Capt. Bryson (uncredited)
 Lady of Burlesque (1943) – 'Stacchi' Stacciaro
 The Ox-Bow Incident (1943) – Major Tetley
 That Hagen Girl (1947) – Dr. Stone
 The Naked City (1948) – Captain Donahue
 All My Sons (1948) – Herbert Deever
 For the Love of Mary (1948) – Samuel Litchfield
 Rogues' Regiment (1948) – Colonel Lemercier
 Sealed Verdict (1948) – Col. Pike
 The Snake Pit (1948) – Dr. Jonathan Gifford
 Mighty Joe Young (1949) – Reporter (uncredited)
 The Threat (1949) – District Attorney Barker MacDonald
 Lightning Strikes Twice (1951) – J.D. Nolan
 The Day the Earth Stood Still (1951) – Mr. Harley (uncredited)
 The Last Mile (1959) – O'Flaherty
 The Young Philadelphians (1959) – Doctor Shippen Stearnes
 The Bramble Bush'' (1960) – Dr. Sol Kelsey

References

External links

 
 
 

1890 births
1964 deaths
20th-century English male actors
Burials at Kensico Cemetery
English male film actors
English male stage actors
People educated at Derby School
People from Derby
Tony Award winners
British emigrants to the United States